The APRA Top 100 New Zealand Songs of All Time is a selection of New Zealand songs as voted in 2001 by members of the Australasian Performing Right Association. The top 30 of this selection was used to create the Nature's Best CD and the rest of the list for follow up compilations. A similar list was made in Australia of the top 30 Australian songs.

Selection
The list was created to commemorate the 75th anniversary of the Australasian Performing Right Association (APRA) in New Zealand in 2001. 900 candidate songs were chosen for APRA members to vote on.
The top 30 songs were released on the Nature's Best CD.

Commentary
Some artists feature prominently in the list. These include:
 Dave Dobbyn with the most songwriting credits (10) and second equal as an artist (6).
 Neil and Tim Finn have second and third place songwriting credits (9 and 8 respectively)
 The Finn-related bands Split Enz and Crowded House have the two highest entries (8 and 6—tied with Dave Dobbyn).
 Don McGlashan has 5 songwriting credits over his work with Blam Blam Blam and The Mutton Birds.
 Singer-songwriters Bic Runga and Sharon O'Neil each have 4 songs in the list.
 Herbs feature 4 times on the list.

Music journalist Bruce Sergent notes that the list is highly skewed towards the 1980s and 90s to the detriment of earlier music, with notable omissions including Howard Morrison, Dinah Lee, and Ray Columbus & the Invaders.

Some songs may also be claimed as both New Zealand and Australian. A list compiled by APRA at the same time of top 30 Australian songs also included Crowded House's "Don't Dream It's Over" (at number 7).

Political songs on the list include commentary on the 1981 Springbok tour riots in Blam Blam Blam's "There Is No Depression in New Zealand", and nuclear testing in the French Pacific through Herbs' "French Letter" and DLT's "Chains".

Top 100 List
The list of the top 100 is below.

See also
 Nature's Best
 Nature's Best 2
 Nature's Best 3
 Nature's Best DVD
 APRA Top 30 Australian songs
 Australasian Performing Right Association

References

External links
 APRA Top 100 Of All Time (Bruce Sergent)
 The National Anthems, The New Zealand Herald, 3 November 2001

New Zealand songs
New Zealand music-related lists
Lists of rated songs